Enrique Alberto Aja Cagigas (born 23 March 1960) is a Spanish former professional racing cyclist. He rode in six editions of the Tour de France and eight editions of the Vuelta a España.

References

External links
 

1960 births
Living people
Spanish male cyclists
Cyclists from Cantabria
People from the Besaya Valley